East Hanover Township is a township in Morris County, New Jersey, United States. As of the 2020 United States census, the township's population was 11,105, a decrease of 52 (−0.5%) from the 2010 census count of 11,157, which in turn reflected a decline of 236 (−2.1%) from the 11,393 counted in the 2000 census.

The North American headquarters of Mondelez International (parent company of Nabisco) and the pharmaceutical company Novartis are located in East Hanover.

History
The Township of Hanover was established on December 7, 1720, and named in honor of the British King George I of the German dynastic House of Hanover. The boundaries of East Hanover are defined by the joining of two rivers, the Whippany River to the west and north and the Passaic River to the east and north. This geographic effect led to the early name of East Hanover, "Hanover Neck." Since the creation of Hanover Township in 1720, its size has been considerably decreased as the population of the area has increased. Originally encompassing large portions of Morris County and parts of both Sussex and Warren County, Hanover Township became too unwieldy for a single local government and municipalities split off from the township over time.

East Hanover was incorporated as a township by an act of the New Jersey Legislature on March 12, 1928, from portions of Hanover Township, based on the results of a referendum held on May 9, 1928, that split off both East Hanover Township and Parsippany–Troy Hills from Hanover Township.

Geography
According to the United States Census Bureau, the township had a total area of 8.10 square miles (20.98 km2), including 7.88 square miles (20.40 km2) of land and 0.23 square miles (0.58 km2) of water (2.79%).

Unincorporated communities, localities and place names located partially or completely within the township include Cooks Bridge, Hanover, Hanover Neck and Swinefield Bridge.

The township borders the municipalities of Florham Park, Hanover Township, Montville, Parsippany–Troy Hills in Morris County; and Fairfield Township, Livingston, Roseland, West Caldwell, Essex County.

Demographics

2010 census

The Census Bureau's 2006–2010 American Community Survey showed that (in 2010 inflation-adjusted dollars) median household income was $116,528 (with a margin of error of +/− $16,406) and the median family income was $122,074 (+/− $5,756). Males had a median income of $74,054 (+/− $9,723) versus $42,500 (+/− $12,460) for females. The per capita income for the township was $49,755 (+/− $5,660). About 2.5% of families and 2.6% of the population were below the poverty line, including 1.5% of those under age 18 and 7.3% of those age 65 or over.

2000 census
As of the 2000 United States census there were 11,393 people, 3,843 households, and 3,212 families residing in the township.  The population density was 1,396.6 people per square mile (539.1/km2).  There were 3,895 housing units at an average density of 477.5 per square mile (184.3/km2).  The racial makeup of the township was 87.08% White, 0.58% African American, 0.03% Native American, 11.14% Asian, 0.24% from other races, and 0.94% from two or more races. Hispanic or Latino of any race were 2.74% of the population.

As of the 2000 Census, 35.6% of East Hanover residents were of Italian ancestry, the 15th-highest percentage of any municipality in the United States, and sixth-highest in New Jersey, among all places with more than 1,000 residents identifying their ancestry.

There were 3,843 households, out of which 34.2% had children under the age of 18 living with them, 72.6% were married couples living together, 8.2% had a female householder with no husband present, and 16.4% were non-families. 13.6% of all households were made up of individuals, and 6.2% had someone living alone who was 65 years of age or older. The average household size was 2.96 and the average family size was 3.26.

In the township the population was spread out, with 22.5% under the age of 18, 6.4% from 18 to 24, 28.3% from 25 to 44, 28.2% from 45 to 64, and 14.6% who were 65 years of age or older. The median age was 41 years. For every 100 females, there were 94.0 males.  For every 100 females age 18 and over, there were 91.9 males.

The median income for a household in the township was $82,133, and the median income for a family was $88,348. Males had a median income of $58,333 versus $36,069 for females. The per capita income for the township was $32,129.  About 1.3% of families and 1.7% of the population were below the poverty line, including 0.2% of those under age 18 and 3.4% of those age 65 or over.

Government

Local government 
East Hanover operates within the Faulkner Act, formally known as the Optional Municipal Charter Law, under Small Municipality plan 3 form of New Jersey municipal government, as implemented as of January 1, 1992, based on the recommendations of a Charter Study Commission. The township is one of 18 municipalities (of the 564) statewide that use this form of government, which is only available to municipalities with fewer than 12,000 residents at the time of adoption. The governing body under the Small Municipality plan is comprised of the Mayor and the Township Council. The mayor is elected to a four-year term and four councilmembers are elected to three-year terms, all elected at-large on a partisan basis as part of the November general election. Councilmembers are elected on a staggered basis in a three-year cycle, with either one or two seats coming up for election each year.

, East Hanover's Mayor is Joseph Pannullo (R, whose term of office ends December 31, 2023. The Township Council is comprised of Council President Brian T. Brokaw Sr. (R, 2022), Frank DeMaio Jr. (R, 2023), Carolyn M. Jandoli (R, 2024) and Michael Martorelli (R, 2023).

Federal, state and county representation 
East Hanover Township is located in the 11th Congressional District and is part of New Jersey's 27th state legislative district. Prior to the 2011 reapportionment following the 2010 Census, East Hanover Township had been in the 26th state legislative district.

 

Morris County is governed by a Board of County Commissioners comprised of seven members who are elected at-large in partisan elections to three-year terms on a staggered basis, with either one or three seats up for election each year as part of the November general election. Actual day-to-day operation of departments is supervised by County Administrator, John Bonanni. , Morris County's Commissioners are
Commissioner Director Tayfun Selen (R, Chatham Township, term as commissioner ends December 31, 2023; term as director ends 2022),
Commissioner Deputy Director John Krickus (R, Washington Township, term as commissioner ends 2024; term as deputy director ends 2022),
Douglas Cabana (R, Boonton Township, 2022), 
Kathryn A. DeFillippo (R, Roxbury, 2022),
Thomas J. Mastrangelo (R, Montville, 2022),
Stephen H. Shaw (R, Mountain Lakes, 2024) and
Deborah Smith (R, Denville, 2024).
The county's constitutional officers are the County Clerk and County Surrogate (both elected for five-year terms of office) and the County Sheriff (elected for a three-year term). , they are 
County Clerk Ann F. Grossi (R, Parsippany–Troy Hills, 2023),
Sheriff James M. Gannon (R, Boonton Township, 2022) and
Surrogate Heather Darling (R, Roxbury, 2024).

Politics
As of March 2011, there were a total of 8,055 registered voters in East Hanover Township, of which 2,708 (33.6%) were registered as Republicans, 2,034 (25.3%) were registered as Democrats,  and 3,313 (41.1%) were registered as Unaffiliated. There were no voters registered to other parties.

In the 2012 presidential election, Republican Mitt Romney received 68.4% of the vote (4,150 cast), ahead of Democrat Barack Obama with 31.1% (1,888 votes), and other candidates with 0.5% (33 votes), among the 6,107 ballots cast by the township's 8,331 registered voters (36 ballots were spoiled), for a turnout of 73.3%. In the 2008 presidential election, Republican John McCain received 67.9% of the vote (4,452 cast), ahead of Democrat Barack Obama with 30.8% (2,017 votes) and other candidates with 0.7% (44 votes), among the 6,553 ballots cast by the township's 8,380 registered voters, for a turnout of 78.2%. In the 2004 presidential election, Republican George W. Bush received 67.5% of the vote (4,258 ballots cast), outpolling Democrat John Kerry with 31.5% (1,988 votes) and other candidates with 0.4% (34 votes), among the 6,312 ballots cast by the township's 8,357 registered voters, for a turnout percentage of 75.5.

In the 2013 gubernatorial election, Republican Chris Christie received 74.5% of the vote (3,075 cast), ahead of Democrat Barbara Buono with 24.6% (1,017 votes), and other candidates with 0.9% (38 votes), among the 4,253 ballots cast by the township's 8,193 registered voters (123 ballots were spoiled), for a turnout of 51.9%. In the 2009 gubernatorial election, Republican Chris Christie received 67.2% of the vote (3,222 ballots cast), ahead of Democrat Jon Corzine with 24.8% (1,189 votes), Independent Chris Daggett with 5.9% (282 votes) and other candidates with 0.4% (21 votes), among the 4,792 ballots cast by the township's 8,208 registered voters, yielding a 58.4% turnout.

Education 
The East Hanover School District serves public school students in pre-kindergarten through eighth grade. As of the 2018–19 school year, the district, comprised of three schools, had an enrollment of 908 students and 94.8 classroom teachers (on an FTE basis), for a student–teacher ratio of 9.6:1. The schools in the district (with 2018–19 enrollment data from the National Center for Education Statistics) are 
Frank J. Smith Elementary School with 322 students in grades Pre-K–2, 
Central Elementary School with 289 students in grades 3–5 and 
East Hanover Middle School with 289 students in grades 6–8.

Students in ninth through twelfth grades for public school are served by the Hanover Park Regional High School District, attending Hanover Park High School in East Hanover, together with students from Florham Park. The district also serves students from the neighboring community of Hanover Township at Whippany Park High School in the Whippany section of Hanover Township. As of the 2018–2019 school year, the high school had an enrollment of 642 students and 58.4 classroom teachers (on an FTE basis), for a student–teacher ratio of 11.0:1. Seats on the high school district's nine-member board of education are allocated based on the population of the constituent municipalities, with East Hanover Township assigned three seats.

Saint Rose of Lima Academy was a Catholic school for students in preschool through eighth grade that operated under the auspices of the Roman Catholic Diocese of Paterson. The school was closed at the end of the 2015–2016 school year.

Transportation

Roads and highways

Interstate 280 is the most prominent highway within East Hanover Township, though there are no exits within the township. The nearest exits, 1 and 4, are both just outside the township in neighboring Parsippany-Troy Hills and Roseland, respectively. Route 10 is the main highway providing local access to East Hanover.

Public transportation
NJ Transit provides bus service to Newark on the 73 route, with local service on the 872 route.

The Whippany Line of the Morristown and Erie Railway, a small freight line, traverses the township. Established in 1895, the line runs from Morristown and runs through East Hanover Township and Hanover Township to Roseland.

Since 2016, Taiwanese airline EVA Air, provides a private bus service to and from John F. Kennedy International Airport in New York City for customers based in New Jersey. It stops in East Hanover.

Places of interest
 Gate of Heaven Cemetery, operated by the Roman Catholic Archdiocese of Newark, was established in 1937.

Notable people

People who were born in, residents of, or otherwise closely associated with East Hanover include:
 Melanie Adams (born 1969), educator and museum administrator, who is director of the Anacostia Community Museum in Washington, D.C.
 Jerry Della Salla (born 1969), decorated combat soldier who fought in the Battle of Abu Ghraib, and later co-starred in the Matt Damon war film Green Zone
 Jedd Fisch (born 1976), football coach who didn't play football in high school or college
 Mary Jane Marcasiano (born 1955), fashion and costume designer, film producer, and social entrepreneur
 Nicole "Snooki" Polizzi (born 1987), reality star of Jersey Shore and its spin-off, Snooki & JWoww
 Stephanie Pollack, engineer and lawyer, Massachusetts Secretary of Transportation since 2015
 Frank Saul (1924–2019), National Basketball Association player
 Frank Sowinski, former professional basketball player.
 Buddy Valastro (born 1977), owner of Carlo's Bakery, as featured on Cake Boss

References

External links

East Hanover Township website
East Hanover School District

School Data for the East Hanover School District, National Center for Education Statistics
Hanover Park High School
Hanover Park Regional High School District
Regional area newspaper
Former East Hanover Nike Missile Site

 
1928 establishments in New Jersey
Faulkner Act (small municipality)
Populated places established in 1928
Townships in Morris County, New Jersey